The Jersey Open was a European Tour golf tournament which was played in Jersey, a British Crown dependency in the English Channel, from 1978 to 1995. It had several different names during this period. The venue was La Moye Golf Club. The winners included three major championship winners, Tony Jacklin, Sandy Lyle and Ian Woosnam. The prize fund peaked at £353,120 in 1994 before falling to £300,000 in the final year, which was below average for a European Tour event at that time. In 1996 a European Seniors Tour event which has been known at various times as the Jersey Seniors Open and by several sponsored names, was inaugurated at the same venue.

Winners

References

External links
Coverage on the European Tour's official site
La Moye Golf Club

Former European Tour events
Golf tournaments in Jersey
Recurring sporting events established in 1978
Recurring sporting events disestablished in 1995
Defunct sports competitions in Jersey